Beris geniculata, the long-horned black legionnaire, is a European species of soldier fly.

Description
Antennae long and placed in the middle of the head or just below.3rd segment of antennae long in female;in male almost two times as long as basal segments together. Thorax metallic green with black pubescence and blue reflections more apparent on the scutellum. Legs black with the knees orange; basal joint of the hind tarsi in the male moderately and equally dilated, longer, than the other four joints together. Wings of both male and female blackish. Abdomen deep dull black, slightly shining on the sides and about the tip. Epandrium with surstyli.  Very similar to Beris fuscipes.

Biology
The Flight period is mid May to early September.Beris geniculata is found in damp woodland and riverside habitats,  
where Angelica sylvestris grows

Distribution
Ireland through North and Central Europe to the East Palaearctic.

References

Stratiomyidae
Diptera of Europe
Insects described in 1830
Taxa named by John Curtis